Appetite for Democracy 3D is a live concert film released in Cinemas, Broadcast and BD/DVD by Guns N' Roses, filmed live at The Joint at the Hard Rock Casino in Las Vegas on November 21, 2012, on the tenth night of their residency, as part of the Appetite for Democracy tour in celebration of twenty-five years of Appetite for Destruction and four years of Chinese Democracy. This is the first live DVD release of Guns N' Roses since Use Your Illusion I and Use Your Illusion II in 1992. The show was filmed entirely in 3D and was produced by Barry Summers from Rock Fuel Media. The cover art features part of the original banned cover art from Appetite For Destruction. The album was officially revealed on May 29, 2014.

The DVD sold 4,800 copies in the United States its first week. The DVD debuted #1 on the Billboard music video sales chart, selling 6,400 copies its first two weeks. It also won Best 3D Music Entertainment Feature at the 2015 International 3D & Advanced Imaging Society Awards.

Videos of the band performing "Chinese Democracy", "November Rain", "Sweet Child O' Mine", "You Could Be Mine" and "Welcome to the Jungle" were released to the band's Vevo channel as promotional material.

Reception
Antimusic gave the DVD 5 out of 5 stars, stating "the combination of excellent musicianship, mesmerizing rock 'n' roll stage presence and superior film work make this show practically jump right into your lap". In a negative review, This Is Not A Scene stated "Guns N' Roses were once dubbed ‘the most dangerous band in the world’; change the word  ‘dangerous’ for ‘hilarious’ or ’embarrassing’ and that pretty much sums up what they represent on this package. A total train wreck." Metal.de's Alex Klug gave the release 7 out of 10,

Formats
 Standard Amaray DVD – full show and bonus interviews.
 Standard 3D Blu-ray – 3D and 2D on 1 disc. Picture format: 1080P, sound format: 5.1 channel DTS-HD Master Audio.
 Digital Long Form – full content available for digital download and via Mobile App.
 Deluxe Edition – 5.1 3D Blu-ray / 2CD / T-shirt bundle

Track listing

DVD/Blu-ray version

CD Version
Disc 1:

Disc 2:

Personnel
Credits are adapted from the DVD's liner notes.

Guns N’ Roses
W. Axl Rose – lead vocals, piano on "Another Brick in the Wall Part 2" and "November Rain", whistling on "Patience", whistle on "Paradise City" and "Nightrain”
Dizzy Reed – keyboards, piano on "Estranged", "This I Love", "Catcher in the Rye",  "Street of Dreams", and "Nightrain",  percussion on "Welcome to The Jungle", "Mr. Brownstone", "Rocket Queen" and "You Could Be Mine", and backing vocals
Tommy Stinson – bass, backing vocals, lead vocals on "Motivation"
DJ Ashba – lead guitar on "This I Love", rhythm guitar
Ron "Bumblefoot" Thal – lead guitar, rhythm guitar, acoustic guitar on "Used to Love Her" and "Patience", backing vocals, lead vocals on "Objectify"
Richard Fortus – rhythm guitar, lead guitar, acoustic guitar on "Patience", slide guitar on "Rocket Queen", backing vocals
Chris Pitman – keyboards, synthesizer, backing vocals, tambourine on "Welcome to the Jungle" and "The Seeker"
Frank Ferrer – drums, tambourine on "Don't Cry"

Dancers
Cassandra Sopher-Setili
Angela Acosta
Lisa Cannon
Tara McClintic

Aerialists
Alyssa McCraw
Kelly Millaudon

Pole-dancers
Ashleigh Park
Ashley Mace

Chart performance
Data from Ultratop.

References

External links
 

Guns N' Roses live albums
Guns N' Roses video albums
2014 live albums
2014 video albums
3D concert films
Hard Rock Hotel and Casino (Las Vegas)
Live video albums